The Minikahda Club is a private country club in southwest Minneapolis, Minnesota. The club is located just west of Bde Maka Ska and is the oldest country club west of the Mississippi River. The clubhouse, which is situated on a high hill, overlooks the lake and has expansive views of the surrounding area and the Minneapolis skyline.

Established in 1898 by a group of wealthy Minneapolis families, the club’s golf course, named one of the top 100 classic golf courses in the United States by Golfweek, has been host to several golf tournaments including the U.S. Open in 1916, the U.S. Amateur in 1927, and the Walker Cup in 1957.

History
Minikahda was founded in 1898 on the hills above the west shore of Bde Maka Ska, the land,  purchased from the Oglala Lakota Chief "Swift Dog" who owned the land in which the golf course stands to this day. At the time, there were no roads around the lake, so the property extended to the lake, with a boathouse for sailing and other aquatic activities. The name Minikahda comes from the Lakota, a combination of two native words meaning 'by the side of the water'. The club logo is a Native American shield, similar to the original artifact which is framed in the clubhouse, the shield belonging to Swift Dog himself.

Golf
Minikahda owns an 18-hole golf course extending to the south and west of the clubhouse with holes on either side of Excelsior Boulevard that is open to members at any time during the golf season. Included on the grounds are a putting green, a chipping green, a driving range, and an iron range as practice areas.

Amateur Chick Evans won the U.S. Open at Minikahda in 1916 and then won the U.S. Amateur later that year at Merion Golf Club to become the first to win both titles in the same season.

In addition to the 1916 U.S. Open, the club has also held the U.S. Amateur in 1927, the Walker Cup in 1957, the U.S. Women's Amateur in 1988, the Curtis Cup in 1998, and the U.S. Senior Amateur in 2017.

References

External links
 

Golf clubs and courses in Minnesota
Walker Cup venues
Curtis Cup venues
Sports venues in Minneapolis
Organizations based in Minneapolis